32A is a 2007 drama film directed and written by Marian Quinn. It was shot principally in Dublin, with additional footage in Roscommon and Sligo.

The script won the inaugural Tiernan McBride Award for screenwriting, as well as Best First Feature on its première at the Galway Film Fleadh. In 2009, the film won an Irish Film and Television Award for cinematography by PJ Dillon.  It had its international premiere at the Berlinale '08 film festival.

A female coming-of-age story, the title refers to the protagonist's bra size.

Plot
The story is set in Raheny, Dublin in 1979. The film opens with its heroine, Maeve, putting on her new snow white bra, and stepping out into the world as a young woman. She has an obsession with breasts and bras and can't help but stare at other girls and women, even the head nun doesn’t escape her gaze. Otherwise, her world revolves around her three friends, Ruth, Claire and Orla, who are more experienced in the ways of the world. They wear bras already (except Claire the feminist) and they have all had boyfriends. The new bra is a start but they really hope Maeve can find a fella, even offering kissing lessons to prepare her. What no one expects, least of all Maeve, is that she should snare the local sixteen- year old heartthrob.

Maeve is so smitten with him that she lets her friends down when they need her the most. In trouble with her friends and in school, she gets dumped by the heartthrob when she sneaks into the local dance with him and he leaves with another girl. Her parents find out and she ends up in trouble at home, where she takes on extra domestic duties. She does the laundry and even her bra has lost its former brilliance. Maeve realises what she has lost. Her friends rally round for her 14th birthday, Maeve returns to the fold a little older and a little wiser.

Cast
 Orla Brady as Jean Brennan
 Aidan Quinn as Frank Brennan
 Ailish McCarthy as Maeve Brennan
 Shane McDaid as Brian Power 
 Sophie Jo wasson as Ruth Murray
 Orla Long as Orla Kennedy
 Riona Smith as Clare Fox
 Jared Harris as Ruth's Father
 Glynis Casson as Imelda
 Jack Kavanagh as Dessie Brennan
 Patrick FitzGerald as Joe Fox
 Liam Weir as Donal Brennan
 Meadhbh Ni Dhalaigh as Sinead Brennan
 Lucas Neville as Dermot
 Alan O'Neill as Paddy
 Kate O'Toole as Sister Una

References

External links
 
 

Irish teen drama films
Irish coming-of-age drama films
2007 films
English-language Irish films
2000s teen drama films
2007 drama films
2000s coming-of-age drama films
Films about puberty
2000s English-language films
Films set in Dublin (city)
Films shot in Dublin (city)
Films set in 1979